The Alpine Fellowship is a charitable foundation that supports, commissions and showcases artists, writers, academics and playwrights. It was founded in 2013 by artist Alan J Lawson and Jacob Burda.

The Symposium 
The focal point of activities is an annual four day symposium. The symposium 'draws together participants from academia, the arts and business' and they have been held on the themes of 'home', 'representation', 'the self-portrait', 'ephemera' and 'landscape'. Fellows, "can attend the symposium by competing in one of the different prize categories: drama, writing and visual arts."

Previous guests have included playwrights Jessica Swale, Polly Stenham, actor Charity Wakefield, philosophers Simon May and Sir Roger Scruton, the novelist Ian McEwan, the poets, Ruth Padel, Gillian Clarke and John Burnside, film maker Luc Jacquet and art historians, including Andrew Graham-Dixon. Symposiums have been held in Switzerland, Scotland, and Italy.

In 2015 The Alpine Fellowship endowed the ‘Alpine Fellows’ programme at NYU ensuring financial support for students pursuing interdisciplinary research at the Graduate Level at NYU.

Past events 
In 2014, the Fellowship discussed the theme of 'representation' with contributions from the realms of academia, music and the visual arts. Philosophers emphasized the difficulties and dangers inherent in the subjectivist approach that regards the world as the 'mere' representation of the subject. 
The annual symposium was held at the Fondazione Giorgio Cini, on the island of San Giorgio, Venice, in the years 2015 through 2018. 

The 2015, symposium convened over the theme 'authorittrato - self-expression in the age of instant communication'. Participants tried to trace the historical developments that occurred since Albrecht Dürer's self-portrait in 1500 to today's 'selfie-culture'. 

In 2016, the Fellowship convened on the topic of ‘Ephemera’ and the nature of time. Philosophers Luciano Floridi and Mark Wrathall spoke to underline the way our self-understanding is inextricably bound up with our understanding of time. 

In 2017, the Fellowship discussed the theme of 'Landscape'. Amongst other things, virtual reality pioneer Nonny de la Pena gave a talk on 'virtual landscapes' that stirred much debate.

In 2018, the theme was 'Childhood'.

In 2019, the theme was 'Identity' and the symposium was hosted at Fjällnäs, Sweden. 

The 2020 and 2021 symposiums were both cancelled due to the pandemic.

In 2022, the theme was 'Freedom' and speakers included Esther Perel, Yuval Harari and Clare Chambers (Philosopher) .

Prizes 
The Alpine Fellowship offers prizes in Academic Writing, Theatre, Poetry, Writing, and Visual Arts. These are aimed at supporting emerging artists, writers and playwrights from around the world.

Advisory board 
The Advisory Board includes Katherine Rundell, Andrew Huddleston, Nell Leyshon, Mike Lesslie, Iain Martin and Sukhdev Sandhu.

References

External links 
 http://www.alpinefellowship.com

 https://www.newstatesman.com/world/north-america/2019/03/jacob-burda-s-diary-point-la-importance-being-heard-and-victory-over

Charities based in London
2013 establishments in England
Arts organizations established in 2013
Arts in England